Vicious Delite is the only full-length album by Vicious Delite, released in 1995. It was re-released in 2000.

Track listing
"The F"*#"k" – 2:13
"So Depressed" – 3:13
"Just Like the Rest" – 2:42
"Outta Sight Outta Mind" – 3:19
"Railbreak" – 2:59
"Pusher" – 3:06
"Inception" – 1:47
"Whats Up w/That" – 1:49
"Like a Dog" – 2:35
"Dizzy" – 3:28 (2000 re-release only)
"LeRoach" – 3:32 (2000 re-release only)

The Japanese release (1995) has 10 songs, the first nine songs above followed by "Secret Agent Man". The first song is listed as "The Screw", but is the same song.

Personnel 
Stephen Pearcy – lead vocals, guitar
Tony Marcus - lead guitar
Michael Andrews – bass guitar
Rob Karras – drums

1995 albums
Vicious Delite albums